Edades Tower, also known as Edades Tower and Garden Villas, is a 53-storey residential skyscraper in Rockwell Center, in Makati City. The building was constructed in 2010 and was completed in 2014. As of 2022, it is the 20th-tallest building in the Philippines.

See also 
 List of tallest buildings in the Philippines

References 

Skyscrapers in Makati
Residential buildings completed in 2014
21st-century architecture in the Philippines